Grace Sulzberger (born 18 December 1988) is an Australian professional racing cyclist.

See also
 2014 Orica-AIS season

References

External links

1988 births
Living people
Australian female cyclists
Place of birth missing (living people)